The World Music Awards is an international award show founded in 1989 under the patronage of Albert II, Prince of Monaco and  co-founder/executive producer John Martinotti. The event is based in Monte Carlo. Awards are presented to the world's best-selling artists in a number of categories and to the best-selling artists from each major territory. The most awarded artist in the history of the World Music Awards is Mariah Carey, with nineteen awards.

Nine awards are voted for online by the public. The awards are gold-plated, each depicting an artist holding the world. The event was last held in 2014.

Charity
Each edition of the World Music Awards builds a hospital, school, or orphanage through the Monaco Aide et Presence Foundation and/or the Combonian Missionary Association, which both assist underdeveloped areas in Africa, Asia, the Caribbean, and South America. There are 23 operational centres still saving lives and providing shelter and education for those in need:

Hospitals
 Phulbani, India
 Rominh, Cambodia
 Port Bouet, Abidjan, Ivory Coast - serves a population of over 170,000 inhabitants
 Butare, Rwanda
 El Daein, Darfur
 Rwarangabo, Burundi (health centre)
 Teberent (health centre)
 Kiota, Niger
 Akamasoa Madagascar
 Mokatam, Egypt - complete renovation and extension of existing hospital
 Maroa, Venezuela (health centre)

Schools
 Coimbatore, India
 Zebizekou, Ivory Coast
 Songon, Ivory Coast
 Kankelena Mali
 Fetabanoye, Niger
 Akamasoa Madagascar

Homes
 Coimbatore, India - 2 homes for abandoned children
 Katukuranda, Sri Lanka - home for handicapped girls
 Yaounde, Cameroon
 Akamasoa Madagascar - 12 homes
 Nova Iguaçu, Rio de Janeiro, Brazil - home for abandoned children
 St. Louis, Haiti

World Music Awards has also paid for five wells to provide clean water in Africa.

Awards events

Legend Award
The Legend Award honors top recording artists who have made outstanding contributions to the music industry. Notable winners of the award include:

 Amr Diab
 Barry White
 Bee Gees
 Beyoncé
 Carlos Santana
 Celine Dion
 Chaka Khan 
 Cher
 Chris Deburgh
 Cliff Richard 
 David Bowie
 Deep Purple
 Destiny's Child 
 Diana Ross
 Elton John
 Flo Rida
 George Benson
 Gloria Gaynor
 INXS
 Janet Jackson
 Jennifer Lopez 
 Julio Iglesias                                                                                                             
 Lionel Richie
 Luciano Pavarotti
 Mariah Carey
 Michael Jackson
 Patti LaBelle
 Placido Domingo
 Prince
 Ray Charles
 Ricky Martin
 Rod Stewart
 Sakis Rouvas  
 Status Quo  
 Stevie Wonder
 The Scorpions
 Tina Turner
 Tony Bennett
 Whitney Houston

Diamond Award
The Diamond Award honors top-selling artists who have been certified as selling over 100,000,000 albums throughout their career. It has been awarded to six recipients to date:
 2002: Rod Stewart
 2003: Mariah Carey
 2004: Celine Dion
 2005: Bon Jovi
 2006: Michael Jackson
 2008: The Beatles

Millennium Award
Two special awards were presented in 2000 to honor the best-selling recording artists at that time. The awards were presented to Michael Jackson and Mariah Carey in the male and female artist award categories, respectively.

References

External links
 

 
Global culture
International music awards
Awards established in 1989